Leonard Bernard Schulte, born Schultehenrich (December 5, 1916 – May 6, 1986), was an American professional baseball player. An infielder, his playing career lasted for 13 seasons (1937–1949), including 124 games over all or parts of three seasons (1944–1946) in the Major Leagues for the St. Louis Browns. The native of St. Charles, Missouri, attended the University of Iowa.

All but five games in Schulte's Major League career occurred during the  season.  Spending the entire season on the St. Louis roster, he appeared in 119 games, 71 as a third baseman, and he batted .247 in 430 at bats.  Altogether, he collected 108 hits with the Browns, including 16 doubles and one triple.

He was a manager in minor league baseball in 1941, before his MLB career began, and then from 1950–1952 in the Browns' and Cincinnati Reds' organizations. An older brother, Ham, also an infielder, played one season in the majors with the  Philadelphia Phillies.

References

1916 births
1986 deaths
Albany Travelers players
Anderson Rebels players
Baseball players from Missouri
Birmingham Barons players
Burlington Flints players
Cedar Rapids Raiders players
Jersey City Giants players
Kinston Eagles players
Major League Baseball infielders
Mayfield Clothiers players
Milwaukee Brewers (AA) players
Minneapolis Millers (baseball) players
Minor league baseball managers
Olean Oilers players
People from St. Charles, Missouri
San Antonio Missions players
Sportspeople from Greater St. Louis
Springfield Browns players
Toledo Mud Hens players
Youngstown Browns players